Aureopteryx argentistriata is a moth in the family Crambidae. It is found from central Mexico south to Paraguay, Brazil and Trinidad. The habitat consists of lowland areas.

The ground colour of the forewings is yellow with deep yellow medial and post medial lines. The subterminal line is silver and there are four silver streaks from the mid-wing to near the subterminal line. The hindwings have a line of dark brown scales, as well as six pairs of marginal spots.

References

Moths described in 1917
Glaphyriinae
Moths of North America
Moths of South America